Chhaeb Wildlife Sanctuary, formerly Preah Vihear Protected Forest,  is a  large protected area in northern Preah Vihear Province of Cambodia comprising large tracts of deciduous dipterocarp and evergreen forests, as well as seasonally inundated grasslands and small wetlands. It is contiguous with Preah Roka Wildlife Sanctuary in the southwest.

The Wildlife Conservation Society (WCS) is active in the campaign against the reduction of wildlife in this part of Cambodia, by advising the local population to reduce the excessive intake of eggs and chicks from the nests themselves. This is a big problem, because the local population is mostly poor and this approach provides them with food and a source of income.

References

External links 

 Map of protected areas in Cambodia

Protected areas of Cambodia
Wildlife sanctuaries of Cambodia
Geography of Preah Vihear province
Protected areas established in 2002
Forests of Cambodia